Mount Walshe is a bare rock peak, 2,050 m, standing at the north side of Bartlett Glacier where it joins Scott Glacier, in southern Hays Mountains, Queen Maud Mountains. Mapped by United States Geological Survey (USGS) from surveys and U.S. Navy air photos, 1960–64. Named by Advisory Committee on Antarctic Names (US-ACAN) for Lieutenant Commander Edward C. Walshe, Jr., U.S. Navy, an officer aboard the Arneb in Antarctica in the 1957–58 and 1958–59 seasons; on the staff of the Commander, U.S. Naval Support Force, Antarctica, during 1966–67.

Mountains of the Ross Dependency
Amundsen Coast